The 2021–22 KNVB Cup, for sponsoring reasons officially called the TOTO KNVB Beker, was the 104th season of the annual Dutch national football cup competition. It began in August with the first of two preliminary rounds, and concluded on 17 April 2022 with the final played at De Kuip in Rotterdam.

Ajax were the defending champions, as they had won the cup in the previous season.

The winners will participate in the 2022 Johan Cruyff Shield against the 2021–22 Eredivisie champions.

Schedule

Matches

First preliminary round 

24 amateur teams qualified for this stage, with 12 teams receiving a bye to the second preliminary round. The draw for the first preliminary round was performed on 15 July 2020. The draw was conducted by Oskar van Logtestijn, player of vv Hoogland.

Second preliminary round 

The second preliminary round was contested by the six winners from the first preliminary round, the twelve teams which got a bye from the preliminary round, the clubs from the Tweede Divisie and the amateur clubs which were disqualified from last year's Cup due to the COVID-19 pandemic in the Netherlands. The matches were played from 21 September through 23 September 2021. The draw took place on 19 August 2021.

First round 

The teams which participated in this round consisted of the 25 amateur teams which won their match in the Second qualifying round, all 16 professional teams from the Eerste Divisie and 13 clubs from the Eredivisie. Ajax, AZ, Feyenoord, PSV and Vitesse automatically advanced to the Second round due to their participation in the European club competitions. The matches were played on 26, 27 and 28 October 2021.

Second round 

The matches for the Second Round were played on 14, 15 and 16 December 2021. The 5 clubs which are playing in one of the various European club competitions as well as the 27 winners of the First Round will participate in this round. The draw was performed on 30 October 2021.

Round of 16 

The matches for the round of 16 were played on 18, 19 and 20 January 2022. The draw was performed on 18 December 2021.

Quarter-finals 

The matches for the quarter-finals were played on 8, 9 and 10 February 2022. The draw was performed on 22 January 2022.

Semi-finals 

The matches for the semi-finals were played on 2 and 3 March 2022. The first part of the draw was performed on 22 January 2022 with the teams playing at home being decided. The second part of the draw was performed on 12 February 2022.

Final

References 

KNVB Cup seasons
Netherlands
KNVB Cup